The Dhubri - Phulbari Bridge is an under-construction bridge over the Brahmaputra River between Assam and Meghalaya in North-East India. 

The Dhubri - Phulbari bridge, to be completed by 2026–27, would be India’s second longest bridge over water after the Mumbai Trans Harbour Link, and would span more than 19 km. This bridge, close to the Bangladesh border, will connect Assam's Dhubri with Meghalaya's Phulbari. It will fill in a missing link of National Highway 127B, connecting Dhubri by road to Tura, Nongstoin, and other towns in western and central Meghalaya. Civil works started in 2019–2020. The project is being funded by Japan International Cooperation Agency and it would be executed by NHIDCL. It is one of 6 proposed bridges on the Brahmaputra.

Larsen and Toubro (L&T) acquired the construction contract for the project, which will feature a navigation bridge including 12.625 km approach viaducts of 3.5 km on the Dubri side and 2.2 km on the Phulbari side, connected with approach roads and interchanges on both sides. 

The bridge, to be built with a total cost of approximately Rs 4,997 crore, will meet the long-standing demand of the people from Assam and Meghalaya who have depended on ferry services to travel between the two banks of the river. It will reduce the distance of 205 Km to be travelled by Road to 19 Km, which is the total length of the bridge.

See also 
 List of bridges on Brahmaputra River

References

Railway bridges in India
Bridges in Assam
Bridges over the Brahmaputra River
Road bridges in India
Road-rail bridges
Bridges under construction
Proposed bridges in India
Transport in Dhubri